The Non-Aligned Movement (NAM) is a forum of 120 countries that are not formally aligned with or against any major power bloc. After the United Nations, it is the largest grouping of states worldwide.

The movement originated in the aftermath of the Korean War, as an effort by some countries to counterbalance the rapid bi-polarization of the world during the Cold War, whereby two major powers formed blocs and embarked on a policy to pull the rest of the world into their orbits. One of these was the pro-Soviet socialist bloc whose best known alliance was the Warsaw Pact, and the other the pro-American capitalist group of countries, many of which belonged to NATO. In 1961, drawing on the principles agreed at the Bandung Conference of 1955, the Non-Aligned Movement was formally established in Belgrade, Yugoslavia, through an initiative of Yugoslav President Josip Broz Tito, Indian Prime Minister Jawaharlal Nehru, Egyptian President Gamal Abdel Nasser, Ghanaian President Kwame Nkrumah, and Indonesian President Sukarno.

This led to the first Conference of Heads of State or Governments of Non-Aligned Countries. The term non-aligned movement first appears in the fifth conference in 1976, where participating countries are denoted as "members of the movement". The purpose of the organization was summarized by Fidel Castro in his Havana Declaration of 1979 as to ensure "the national independence, sovereignty, territorial integrity and security of non-aligned countries" in their "struggle against imperialism, colonialism, neo-colonialism, racism, and all forms of foreign aggression, occupation, domination, interference or hegemony as well as against great power and bloc politics."

The countries of the Non-Aligned Movement represent nearly two-thirds of the United Nations' members and contain 55% of the world population. Membership is particularly concentrated in countries considered to be developing or part of the Third World, although the Non-Aligned Movement also has a number of developed nations.

The Non-Aligned Movement gained the most traction in the 1950s and early 1960s, when the international policy of non-alignment achieved major successes in decolonization, disarmament, opposition to racism and opposition to apartheid in South Africa, and persisted throughout the entire Cold War, despite several conflicts between members, and despite some members developing closer ties with either the Soviet Union, China, or the United States. In the years since the Cold War's end in 1992, the movement has focused on developing multilateral ties and connections as well as unity among the developing nations of the world, especially those within the Global South.

History

Origins and the Cold War 

The term 'Non-Alignment' was used for the first time in 1950 at the United Nations by India and Yugoslavia, both of which refused to align themselves with any side in the multi-alliances involving Korean War. Drawing on the principles agreed at the Bandung Conference in 1955, the Non-Aligned Movement as an organization was founded on the Brijuni islands in Yugoslavia in 1956 and was formalized by signing the Declaration of Brijuni on 19 July 1956. The Declaration was signed by Yugoslavia's president, Josip Broz Tito, India's prime minister Jawaharlal Nehru and Egypt's president, Gamal Abdel Nasser. One of the quotations within the Declaration is "Peace can not be achieved with separation, but with the aspiration towards collective security in global terms and expansion of freedom, as well as terminating the domination of one country over another". According to Rejaul Karim Laskar, an ideologue of the Congress party which ruled India for most part of the Cold War years, the Non-Aligned Movement arose from the desire of Jawaharlal Nehru and other leaders of the newly independent countries of the third world to guard their independence and sovereignty "in face of complex international situation demanding allegiance to either two warring superpowers".

The Movement advocates a middle course for states in the developing world between the Western and Eastern Blocs during the Cold War. The phrase itself was first used to represent the doctrine by Indian diplomat V. K. Krishna Menon in 1953, at the United Nations.

But it soon after became the name to refer to the participants of the Conference of Heads of State or Government of Non-Aligned Countries first held in 1961. The term "non-alignment" was established in 1953 at the United Nations. Nehru used the phrase in a 1954 speech in Colombo, Sri Lanka. In this speech, Zhou Enlai and Nehru described the Five Principles of Peaceful Coexistence to be used as a guide for Sino-Indian relations called Panchsheel (five restraints); these principles would later serve as the basis of the Non-Aligned Movement. The five principles were:
 Mutual respect for each other's territorial integrity and sovereignty.
 Mutual non-aggression.
 Mutual non-interference in domestic affairs.
 Equality and mutual benefit.
 Peaceful co-existence.

A significant milestone in the development of the Non-Aligned Movement was the 1955 Bandung Conference, a conference of Asian and African states hosted by Indonesian president Sukarno, who gave a significant boost to promote this movement. Bringing together Sukarno, U Nu, Nasser, Nehru, Tito, Nkrumah and Menon with the likes of Ho Chi Minh, Zhou Enlai, and Norodom Sihanouk, as well as U Thant and a young Indira Gandhi, the conference adopted a "declaration on promotion of world peace and cooperation", which included Zhou Enlai and Nehru's five principles, and a collective pledge to remain neutral in the Cold War. Six years after Bandung, an initiative of Yugoslav president Josip Broz Tito led to the first Conference of Heads of State or Government of Non-Aligned Countries, which was held in September 1961 in Belgrade. The term non-aligned movement appears first in the fifth conference in 1976, where participating countries are denoted as members of the movement.

At the Lusaka Conference in September 1970, the member nations added as aims of the movement the peaceful resolution of disputes and the abstention from the big power military alliances and pacts. Another added aim was opposition to stationing of military bases in foreign countries.

In 1975, the member nations which also were part of the United Nations General Assembly pushed for the Resolution 3379 along with Arab countries and the support of the Soviet bloc. It was a declarative non-binding measure that equated Zionism with South Africa's Apartheid and as a form of racial discrimination. This process was a manifestation of Cold War bipolar logics. The bloc voting produced a majority in the United Nations that systematically condemned Israel in the following resolutions: 3089, 3210, 3236, 32/40, etc.

Some Non-Aligned member nations were involved in serious conflicts with other members, notably India and Pakistan as well as Iran and Iraq.

Cuba's role 

In the 1970s, Cuba made a major effort to assume a leadership role in the world's non-alignment movement. The country established military advisory missions and economic and social reform programs. The 1976 world conference of the Non-Aligned Movement applauded Cuban internationalism, "which assisted the people of Angola in frustrating the expansionist and colonialist strategy of South Africa's racist regime and its allies." The next Non-Aligned conference was scheduled for Havana in 1979, to be chaired by Fidel Castro, with his becoming the de facto spokesman for the Movement. The conference in September 1979 marked the zenith of Cuban prestige. Most, but not all, attendees believed that Cuba was not aligned with the Soviet camp in the Cold War.

However, in December 1979, the Soviet Union intervened in Afghanistan's civil war. Up until that time, Afghanistan was also an active member of the Non-Aligned Movement. At the United Nations, nonaligned members voted 56 to 9, with 26 abstaining, to condemn the Soviet Union. Cuba voted against the resolution, in support of the U.S.S.R. It lost its nonaligned leadership and reputation after Castro, instead of becoming a high-profile spokesman for the Movement, remained quiet and inactive. More broadly the Movement was deeply split over the Soviet–Afghan War in 1979, as many members of the Non-Aligned Movement, particularly the predominantly Muslim states, condemned it.

Post-Cold War 

Because the Non-Aligned Movement formed as an attempt to thaw out the Cold War, it has struggled to find relevance since the Cold War ended . The breakup of Yugoslavia (a prominent founding member) in 1991-1992 also affected the Movement; the regular Ministerial Meeting of the Movement, held in New York during the regular yearly session of the General Assembly of the United Nations in 1992 suspended Yugoslavia's membership. (The various successor-states of the Socialist Federal Republic of Yugoslavia have expressed little interest in membership, though Serbia and Bosnia and Herzegovina have observer status.) India, another founding member, appears to have downgraded its emphasis on the Movement.

In 2004 Malta and Cyprus ceased to be members when they joined the European Union, as required. Belarus is the only member of the Movement in Europe. Azerbaijan and Fiji are the most recent entrants, joining in 2011. Membership-applications from Bosnia and Herzegovina and from Costa Rica were rejected in 1995 and 1998 respectively.

Since the end of the Cold War, the Non-Aligned Movement has felt forced to redefine itself and to reinvent its purpose in the new world-system. A major question has been whether any of its foundational ideologies, principally national independence, territorial integrity, and the struggle against colonialism and imperialism, apply to contemporary issues. The movement has emphasised its principles of multilateralism, equality, and mutual non-aggression in attempting to become a stronger voice for the Global South, and an instrument that can promote the needs of member-nations at the international level and strengthen their political leverage when negotiating with developed nations. In its efforts to advance Southern interests, the movement has stressed the importance of cooperation and unity amongst member states. However, as in the past, cohesion remains a problem, since the size of the organisation and the divergence of agendas and allegiances present the ongoing potential for fragmentation. While agreement on basic principles has been smooth, taking definitive action vis-à-vis particular international issues has been rare, with the movement preferring to assert its criticism or support rather than to pass hard-line resolutions.

The Movement continues to see a role for itself: in its view, the world's poorest nations remain exploited and marginalised, no longer by opposing superpowers, but rather in a uni-polar world, and it is Western hegemony and neo-colonialism that the movement has really re-aligned itself against. It opposes foreign occupation, interference in internal affairs and aggressive unilateral measures, but it has also shifted to focus on the socio-economic challenges facing member states, especially the inequalities manifested by globalization and the implications of neo-liberal policies. The Non-Aligned Movement has identified economic underdevelopment, poverty, and social injustices as growing threats to peace and security.

The 16th NAM summit took place in Tehran, Iran, from 26 to 31 August 2012. According to the Teheran-based Mehr News Agency, representatives from over 150 countries were scheduled to attend. Attendance at the highest level included 27 presidents, two kings and emirs, seven prime ministers, nine vice-presidents, two parliamentary spokesmen and five special envoys. At the summit, Iran took over from Egypt as Chair of the Non-Aligned Movement for the period 2012 to 2015.

In 2016 Venezuela hosted the 17th NAM Summit.

Azerbaijan, host of the 18th NAM summit in 2019, holds the Non-Aligned Movement presidency pending the 19th summit, scheduled to take place in Uganda in 2022.

Organizational structure and membership 

The movement stems from a desire not to be aligned within a geopolitical/military structure and therefore itself does not have a very strict organizational structure. Some organizational basics were defined at the 1996 Cartagena Document on Methodology The Summit Conference of Heads of State or Government of Non-Aligned States is "the highest decision making authority". The chairmanship rotates between countries and changes at every summit of heads of state or government to the country organizing the summit.

Requirements for membership of the Non-Aligned Movement coincide with the key beliefs of the United Nations. The current requirements are that the candidate country has displayed practices in accordance with the ten "Bandung principles" of 1955:
 Respect for fundamental human rights and for the purposes and principles of the Charter of the United Nations.
 Respect for the sovereignty and territorial integrity of all nations.
 Recognition of the movements for national independence.
 Recognition of the equality of all races and of the equality of all nations, large and small.
 Abstention from intervention or interference in the internal affairs of another country.
 Respect for the right of each nation to defend itself singly or collectively, in conformity with the Charter of the United Nations.
 Refraining from acts or threats of aggression or the use of force against the territorial integrity or political independence of any country.
 Settlement of all international disputes by peaceful means, in conformity with the Charter of the United Nations.
 Promotion of mutual interests and co-operation.
 Respect for justice and international obligations.

Policies and ideology 

Chairpersons of the NAM have included such diverse figures as Suharto, a militaristic anti-communist, and Nelson Mandela, a democratic socialist and famous anti-apartheid activist. Consisting of many governments with vastly different ideologies, the Non-Aligned Movement is unified by its declared commitment to world peace and security. At the seventh summit held in New Delhi in March 1983, the movement described itself as "history's biggest peace movement". The movement places equal emphasis on disarmament. NAM's commitment to peace pre-dates its formal institutionalisation in 1961. The Brioni meeting between heads of governments of India, Egypt and Yugoslavia in 1956 recognized that there exists a vital link between struggle for peace and endeavours for disarmament.

During the 1970s and early 1980s, the NAM also sponsored campaigns for restructuring commercial relations between developed and developing nations, namely the New International Economic Order (NIEO), and its cultural offspring, the New World Information and Communication Order (NWICO). The latter, on its own, sparked a Non-Aligned initiative on cooperation for communications, the Non-Aligned News Agencies Pool, created in 1975 and later converted into the NAM News Network in 2005.

The Non-Aligned Movement espouses policies and practices of cooperation, especially those that are multilateral and provide mutual benefit to all those involved. Almost all of the members of the Non-Aligned Movement are also members of the United Nations. Both organisations have a stated policy of peaceful cooperation, yet the successes the NAM has had with multilateral agreements tend to be ignored by the larger, western- and developed- nation-dominated UN. African concerns about apartheid were linked with Arab-Asian concerns about Palestine and multilateral cooperation in these areas has enjoyed moderate success. The Non-Aligned Movement has played a major role in various ideological conflicts throughout its existence, including extreme opposition to apartheid governments and support of guerrilla movements in various locations, including Rhodesia and South Africa.

Current activities and positions

Reform of the UN Security Council 

The movement has been outspoken in its criticism of current UN structures and power dynamics, and advocating for the reforming of the United Nations Security Council, stating that the organisation has been used by powerful states in ways that violate the movement's principles. It has made a number of recommendations that it says would strengthen the representation and power of "non-aligned" states. The proposed UN reforms are also aimed at improving the transparency and democracy of UN decision-making. The UN Security Council is the element it considers the most distorted, undemocratic, and in need of reshaping.

Self-determination of Puerto Rico 

Since 1961, the organization has supported the discussion of the case of Puerto Rico's self-determination before the United Nations. A resolution on the matter was to be proposed on the XV Summit by the Hostosian National Independence Movement but did not progress.

Self-determination of Western Sahara 

Since 1973, the group has supported the discussion of the case of Western Sahara's self-determination before the United Nations. The movement reaffirmed in its meeting (Sharm El Sheikh 2009) the support to the Self-determination of the Sahrawi people by choosing between any valid option, welcomed the direct conversations between the parties, and remembered the responsibility of the United Nations on the Sahrawi issue.

Sustainable developments 

The movement is publicly committed to the tenets of sustainable development and the attainment of the Millennium Development Goals, but it believes that the international community has not created conditions conducive to development and has infringed upon the right to sovereign development by each member state. Issues such as globalization, the debt burden, unfair trade practices, the decline in foreign aid, donor conditionality, and the lack of democracy in international financial decision-making are cited as factors inhibiting development.

Criticism of US foreign policy 

In recent years the organization has criticized certain aspects of US foreign policy. The 2003 invasion of Iraq and the War on Terrorism, its attempts to stifle Iran and North Korea's nuclear plans, and its other actions have been denounced by some members of the Non-Aligned Movement as attempts to run roughshod over the sovereignty of smaller nations; at the most recent summit, Kim Yong-nam, chairman of North Korea's parliamentary standing committee, stated, "The United States is attempting to deprive other countries of even their legitimate right to peaceful nuclear activities."

South–South cooperation 

The Non-Aligned Movement Centre for South-South Technical Cooperation (NAM CSSTC) as an intergovernmental institution, which enables developing countries to increase national capacity and their collective self-reliance, forms part of the efforts of NAM.

The NAM CSSTC is located in Jakarta, Indonesia with a South-South Technical Cooperation focus. Other NAM Centres focus on the health, human rights and technology sectors are each located in Cuba, Iran and India.

The NAM CSSTC was set up a few years after the Cold War to promote development in developing countries and to accelerate growth. From 18 to 20 October 1995, in Cartgena de Indias, 140 nations gathered and accepted a final document stating in paragraph 313 of the Final Document the establishment of the Centre for South-South Technical Cooperation in Indonesia.

The organisation aims to achieve the development goal of developing countries to achieve sustainable human development and enable developing countries to be equal partners in international relations, in accordance with the Final Document.

The NAM CSSTC's main body is the board of directors. In addition, the Board of Directors has a consultative arrangement with a Governing Council under the leadership of the Vice Minister for Foreign Affairs of the Republic of Indonesia and its members include Ambassador of Brunei, Ambassador of Cuba and Ambassador of South Africa.

The head of the administrative officer of NAM CSSTC is accredited by Ronny Prasetyo Yuliantoro, Director, current Indonesian diplomat and Ambassador of the Republic of Indonesia to the Islamic Republic of Iran, who began his term of office on 1 July 2018. The organisation is financed by Indonesia's volunteer contributions.

The NAM CSSTC, its officers, consists of a full-time staff who are not affiliated with any other governmental institution except their head of the administrative officer, who is typically nominated from Echelon-I or Echelon-II staff from the Indonesian ministries. Some say the organisation is a major endeavour to build NAM member countries' capacities.

History 

A few years before the NAM CSSTC was set up, the NAM summit in 1992 in Jakarta to discuss efforts to strengthen collective autonomy and to review of the international economic environment in order to step up South-South cooperation.

After the admission of Brunei Darussalam to the NAM during the summit, the Government of the Republic of Indonesia called for a South-South Technical Cooperation Centre (now known as the NAM CSSTC) to be established by the Government of the Republic of Indonesia and the Government of Brunei Darussalam with the aim of organising different training, research and seminar programmes and activities. The programme activities, aimed at eradicating poverty, encouraging SMEs and the application of information communication technologies.

Programmes 

The NAM CSSTC carries out its activities through cooperation with NAM member countries' training centres and specialists and other multilateral organisations. Examples include Workshop on IUU fishing eradication, dispatch of agricultural experts to Myanmar and international tissue culture training.

Evaluations 

NAM CSSTC reports quarterly to the Ministry of Foreign Affairs of the Republic of Indonesia and the NAM Coordinating Bureau in New York. Annually, the Ministry and the Bureau will be given additional details on programmes and events, including their assessments.

Cultural diversity and human rights 

The movement accepts the universality of human rights and social justice, but fiercely resists cultural homogenisation. In line with its views on sovereignty, the organisation appeals for the protection of cultural diversity, and the tolerance of the religious, socio-cultural, and historical particularities that define human rights in a specific region. 

Working groups, task forces, committees

 Committee on Palestine
 High-Level Working Group for the Restructuring of the United Nations
 Joint Coordinating Committee (chaired by Chairman of G-77 and Chairman of NAM)
 Non-Aligned Security Caucus
 Standing Ministerial Committee for Economic Cooperation
 Task Force on Somalia
 Working Group on Disarmament
 Working Group on Human Rights
 Working Group on Peace-Keeping Operations

Summits 

The conference of Heads of State or Government of the Non-Aligned Countries, often referred to as Non-Aligned Movement Summit is the main meeting within the movement and are held every few years:

A variety of ministerial meetings are held between the summit meetings. Some are specialist, such as the meeting on "Inter-Faith Dialogue and Co-operation for Peace", held in Manila, the Philippines, 16–18 March 2010. There is a general Conference of Foreign Ministers every three years. The most recent were in Bali, Indonesia, 23–27 May 2011 and Algiers, Algeria, 26–29 May 2014.

The Non-Aligned Movement celebrated its 50th anniversary in Belgrade on 5–6 September 2011.

An online summit titled "United Against Covid-19" conducted on 4 May 2020, on the initiative of the chairman of the NAM for the 2019–2022 period, addressed mainly the global struggle to fight the COVID-19 pandemics and supporting NAM to increase its role in dealing with and mitigating the outcomes caused by this disease in NAM, as well as other countries.

The Non-Aligned Movement celebrated its 60th anniversary in Belgrade, on 11–12 October 2021.

Chair 

A chair is elected at each summit meeting. The Coordinating Bureau, also based at the UN, is the main instrument for directing the work of the movement's task forces, committees and working groups.

Members, observers and guests

Current members 

The following countries are members of the NAM, arranged by continent, showing their year of admission:

Africa 

Currently every African country (except South Sudan) is a member of the Non-Aligned Movement.

  (1961)
  (1976)
  (1964)
  (1970)
  (1973)
  (1964)
  (1964)
  (1976)
  (1964)
  (1964)
  (1976)
  (1961)
  (1983)
  (1961)
  (1970)
  (1995)
  (1970)
  (1961)
  (1970)
  (1973)
  (1961)
  (1961)
  (1976)
  (1973)
  (1964)
  (1970)
  (1964)
  (1964)
  (1973)
  (1964)
  (1961)
  (1964)
  (1973)
  (1961)
  (1976)
  (1979)
  (1973)
  (1964)
  (1964)
  (1970)
  (1976)
  (1964)
  (1976)
  (1964)
  (1961)
  (1994)
  (1961)
  (1964)
  (1964)
  (1961)
  (1964)
  (1964)
  (1979)

America 

  (2006)
  (1983)
  (1983)
  (1981)
  (1979)
  (1973)
  (1983)
  (1961)
  (2006)
  (2000)
  (1983)
  (1979)
  (1993)
  (1970)
  (2006)
  (1995)
  (1970)
  (1979)
  (1976)
  (1973)
  (2006)
  (1983)
  (2003)
  (1983)
  (1970)
  (1989)

Asia 

  (1961)
  (1973)
  (1973)
  (1973)
  (1993)
  (1961)
  (1961)
  (1961)
  (1979)
  (1961)
  (1964)
  (1964)
  (1964)
  (1961)
  (1970)
  (1976)
  (1993)
  (1961)
  (1961)
  (1975)
  (1973)
  (1979)
  (1976)
  (1993)
  (1973)
  (1961)
  (1970)
  (1961)
  (1964)
  (1993)
  (2003)
  (1995)
  (1970)
  (1993)
  (1976)
  (1990)

Europe 

  (1998)
  (2011)

Oceania 

  (2011)
  (1993)
  (1983)

Former members 

  (1961–1990)
  (1961–2004)
  (1961–1992)
  (1970–1990)
  (1973–2004)
  (1973–1991)

Observers 

The following countries and organizations have observer status:

Countries 

 
 
 
 
  (1992)
 
 
 
 
 
 
 
 
  (2021)
 
 
 
 
 
  (1970)

Organisations 

 Association of Southeast Asian Nations
 African Union
 Afro-Asian People's Solidarity Organisation
 Arab League
 Commonwealth Secretariat
 Hostosian National Independence Movement
 Kanak and Socialist National Liberation Front
 Organisation of Islamic Cooperation
 South Centre
 United Nations
 World Peace Council

Guests 

There is no permanent guest status, but often several non-member countries are represented as guests at conferences. In addition, a large number of organisations, both from within the UN system and from outside, are always invited as guests.

See also 

 Asian–African Conference
 Dual loyalty
 Five Principles of Peaceful Coexistence
 G-77
 Neutral country
 Neutral powers during World War II
 New World Information and Communication Order
 North–South divide
 Policy of deliberate ambiguity
 India and the Non-Aligned Movement
 Yugoslavia and the Non-Aligned Movement
 South-South Cooperation
 Third World
 Strategic autonomy
 Neutral and Non-Aligned European States

References

Further reading 

 Arnold, Guy. The A to Z of the Non-aligned Movement and Third World (Scarecrow Press, 2010).
 Dinkel, Jürgen. The Non-Aligned Movement: Genesis, Organization and Politics (1927–1992) (Brill: Leiden/Boston, 2019). .
 Graham, John A. "The non-aligned movement after the Havana Summit." Journal of International Affairs (1980): 153-160 online.
 Kansal, Shubhangi. "Non-Aligned Movement in The 21st Century: Relevant or No?." (2020). online 
 Köchler, Hans (ed.), The Principles of Non-Alignment. The Non-aligned Countries in the Eighties—Results and Perspectives. (London: Third World Centre, 1982). 
 Lüthi, Lorenz M. "The Non-Aligned Movement and the Cold War, 1961–1973." Journal of Cold War Studies 18.4 (2016): 98–147. online
 Miskovic, Natasa, Harald Fischer-Tiné, and Nada Boskovska, eds. The non-aligned movement and the Cold War: Delhi-Bandung-Belgrade (Routledge, 2014).
 Mukherjee, Mithi. "'A World of Illusion': The Legacy of Empire in India's Foreign Relations, 1947–62". The International History Review 32:2 (June, 2010): 253-271.
 Potter, William. Nuclear politics and the Non-aligned movement: Principles vs pragmatism (Routledge, 2017).
 Tassin, Kristin S. "'Lift up Your Head, My Brother': Nationalism and The Genesis of the Non-aligned Movement." Journal of Third World Studies 23.1 (2006): 147-168 online.

External links

 18th Summit Eighteenth Non-Aligned Movement Summit (Baku 2019)
 Official Site: 17th Summit Seventeenth Non-Aligned Movement Summit (Margarita, Venezuela 2016)
 Official Site: 16th Summit Sixteenth Non-Aligned Movement Summit (Tehran 26–31 August 2012)
 Official Site: 15th Summit Fifteenth Non-Aligned Movement Summit (Sharm el-Sheikh 11–16 July 2009)
 Official Site: 14th Summit Fourteenth Non-Aligned Movement Summit (Havana, 11–16 September 2006)
 Non-Aligned Movement South African government NAM site
 International Institute for Non-Aligned Studies  International Organization for Non-Aligned Movement
 Non-Aligned Movement Centre for South-South Technical Cooperation
 The Cold War International History Project's Document Collection on the NAM

 
1961 establishments in Yugoslavia
1961 establishments in Serbia
Organizations established in 1961
1960s in Belgrade
20th century in international relations
21st century in international relations
Cold War organizations
Foreign policy doctrines of India